Hopfgarten im Brixental is a market town in the Austrian state of Tyrol in the Kitzbühel district. It is located at an elevation of 622 m above sea level. With an area of 166.57 km² it is the largest municipality in the district, and among the largest in Tyrol.

Population

Tourism
It is a popular place for all levels of skier with a variety of slopes ranging from black slopes for expert skiers to nursery slopes for beginners, and featuring a ski school. There are also many neighbouring towns with an extended variety of slopes including Itter a perfect slope for those early skiing lessons. A trip on the gondola is worth doing if just for the view at the top. You can even parapent off the top if you choose.

For the non-thrill-seekers there are also plenty of options. You can visit one of the typical Austrian restaurants such as the Gasthof Traube where you can try meals such as schnitzel, strudel or noodles. It also has a renowned church with a wonderful ceiling.

Notable people
Andreas Benedict Feilmoser, theologian

See also
Kitzbühel (district)

Panorama

References

External links 

Website of the Hopfgarten Tourist Board
Pictures of Hopfgarten im Brixental and information in English language
Hopfgarten Gigapixel Panorama (8.120 Megapixel)

Cities and towns in Kitzbühel District
Kitzbühel Alps